Naso di cane (also known as A Dog's Nose) is a 1986 Italian crime-drama television miniseries, written and directed by Pasquale Squitieri and starring Luca De Filippo. It is loosely based on a novel of the same name written by Attilio Veraldi, who also collaborated on the screenplay.

Plot

Cast

 Luca De Filippo as Police Commissioner Corrado Apicella
 Nigel Court as Ciro Mele, aka "Naso 'e cane"
Claudia Cardinale as Laura
Donald Pleasence as  Olindo Cuomo
Raymond Pellegrin as Antonio Garofalo
Yorgo Voyagis as  Achille Ammirato
Nancy Brilli as  Rosa
 Marzio Honorato as  Rassetiello
Giuseppe Cederna as  Merdillo
Victor Cavallo as  Nichiello
 Salvatore Billa as  Salvatore Palestra

References

External links
 

1986 television films
1986 films
Italian television films
Films directed by Pasquale Squitieri
RAI original programming
1980s Italian television miniseries
1980s Italian films